O Nikolos, is a kind of a Greek folk dance from the area of Siatista, Greece.

See also
Music of Greece
Greek dances

References
Ελληνικοί παραδοσιακοί χοροί - Ο Νικολός

Greek dances
Macedonia (Greece)